Smithville is a village in Wayne County, Ohio, United States. The population was 1,252 at the time of the 2010 census. The village derives its name from Thomas Smith, a pioneer settler.

Geography
Smithville is located at  (40.863457, -81.858665), along Sugar Creek.

Demographics

2010 census
As of the census of 2010, there were 1,252 people, 541 households, and 371 families living in the village. The racial makeup of the village was 97.8% White, 0.9% African American, 0.4% Native American, 0.6% Asian, and 0.3% from two or more races. Hispanic or Latino of any race were 1.3% of the population.

There were 541 households, of which 28.5% had children under the age of 18 living with them, 52.1% were married couples living together, 12.9% had a female householder with no husband present, 3.5% had a male householder with no wife present, and 31.4% were non-families. 28.1% of all households were made up of individuals, and 9.6% had someone living alone who was 65 years of age or older. The average household size was 2.31 and the average family size was 2.81.

The median age in the village was 44.2 years. 21.8% of residents were under the age of 18; 8.6% were between the ages of 18 and 24; 20.4% were from 25 to 44; 32.7% were from 45 to 64; and 16.6% were 65 years of age or older. The gender makeup of the village was 47.1% male and 52.9% female.

2000 census
As of the census of 2000, there were 1,333 people, 545 households, and 395 families living in the village. The population density was 1,079.5 people per square mile (418.4/km). There were 562 housing units at an average density of 455.1 per square mile (176.4/km). The racial makeup of the village was 98.65% White, 0.15% African American, 0.23% Native American, 0.53% Asian, and 0.45% from two or more races. Hispanic or Latino of any race were 0.45% of the population.

There were 545 households, out of which 31.7% had children under the age of 18 living with them, 59.1% were married couples living together, 10.6% had a female head of household with no husband present, and 27.5% were non-families. 26.8% of all households were made up of individuals, and 11.6% had someone living alone who was 65 years of age or older. The average household size was 2.45 and the average family size was 2.93.

In the village, the population was spread out, with 25.0% under the age of 18, 8.3% from 18 to 24, 27.8% from 25 to 44, 22.1% from 45 to 64, and 16.7% who were 65 years of age or older. The median age was 38 years. For every 100 females there were 90.4 males. For every 100 females age 18 and over, there were 86.2 males.

The median income for a household in the village was $39,662, and the median income for a family was $47,109. Males had a median income of $32,500 versus $22,847 for females. The per capita income for the village was $18,329. About 5.2% of families and 5.9% of the population were below the poverty line, including 6.3% of those under age 18 and 7.1% of those age 65 or over.

Education
Smithville is home to the Wayne County Schools Career Center. It is also home to the campus of the Green Local School District, which also includes nearby Marshallville.

Notable residents
 Kirtland I. Perky, United States senator from Idaho
 John Howard Yoder, prominent Mennonite theologian and ethicist and Biblical scholar
 Dale Willman, Award-winning journalist
 David Dale Reimer, ambassador to Mauritius and the Seychelles, and later to Sierra Leone

References

External links
 Village of Smithville Official Website
GTCPS Community Center
Smithville Community Historical Society

Villages in Wayne County, Ohio
Villages in Ohio